Nothofagus glauca, commonly known as hualo or roble Maulino, is a species of plant in the family Nothofagaceae. It is a deciduous tree endemic to Chile. It grows from 34° to 37° South latitude.  N. glauca was proposed to be renamed Lophozonia glauca in 2013. It is a typical tree of the mediterranean Maulino forest of Central Chile, its current range spanning over 330 km from north to south. The species grow on a variety of soils and is mostly found on gentle to steep slopes.

Description
Nothofagus glauca grows up to 30 m (100 ft) height and 2 m (6.5 ft) diameter, with a straight and cylindrical trunk. The bark is gray-reddish and rough. It lives in places with long droughts. Is very useful for reforestating areas with very bent slopes and with long dry season in summer. It is threatened by habitat loss.

Leaves alternate, petioles  2–7 mm long, aovate, base subcordate, both faces with glands giving to them harsh texture, glaucous above, undulate margins, irregularly serrate; lamina twisted 5–9 cm, notorious pinate venation.

Flowers unisexual, small; male solitary, pedicels up to 1 cm, 50 stamens; female flowers in 3 in inflorescences. Fruit cupule with 4 narrow valves, with three yellowish nuts 12–20 mm long, pilose, the two lower triangular, tri-winged, and the internal flat and bi-winged.

References

 Encyclopedia of Chilean Flora: '"Hualo'" - Nothofagus glauca
Donoso, C. 2005. Árboles nativos de Chile. Guía de reconocimiento. Edición 4. Marisa Cuneo Ediciones, Valdivia, Chile. 136p. 
Hoffmann, Adriana. 1998. Flora Silvestre de Chile, Zona Central. Edición 4. Fundación Claudio Gay, Santiago. 254p. 
Rodríguez, R. & Quezada, M. 2003. Fagaceae. En C. Marticorena y R. Rodríguez [eds.], Flora de Chile Vol. 2(2), pp 64–76. Universidad de Concepción, Concepción. 

Nothofagaceae
Endemic flora of Chile
Trees of Chile
Flora of central Chile
Trees of Mediterranean climate
Drought-tolerant trees
Vulnerable plants
Taxonomy articles created by Polbot
Fagales of Chile